Oroszlány is a district in southern part of Komárom-Esztergom County. Oroszlány is also the name of the town where the district seat is found. The district is located in the Central Transdanubia Statistical Region.

Geography 
Oroszlány District borders with Komárom District and Tata District to the north, Tatabánya District to the east, Bicske District and Mór District (Fejér County) to the south, Kisbér District to the west. The number of the inhabited places in Oroszlány District is 6.

Municipalities 
The district has 1 town and 5 villages.
(ordered by population, as of 1 January 2013)

The bolded municipality is the city.

Demographics

In 2011, it had a population of 26,163 and the population density was 131/km².

Ethnicity
Besides the Hungarian majority, the main minorities are the German (approx. 700), Roma and Slovak (200), Romanian (150).

Total population (2011 census): 26,163
Ethnic groups (2011 census): Identified themselves: 23,489 persons:
Hungarians: 21,761 (92.64%)
Germans: 708 (3.01%)
Gypsies: 498 (2.12%)
Others and indefinable: 522 (2.22%)
Approx. 2,500 persons in Oroszlány District did not declare their ethnic group at the 2011 census.

Religion
Religious adherence in the county according to 2011 census:

Catholic – 7,525 (Roman Catholic – 7,375; Greek Catholic – 147);
Reformed – 2,284;
Evangelical – 1,277; 
other religions – 397; 
Non-religious – 6,879; 
Atheism – 418;
Undeclared – 7,382.

See also
List of cities and towns in Hungary

References

External links
 Postal codes of the Oroszlány District

Districts in Komárom-Esztergom County